Serendipity is a series of children's books about animals and other creatures. The books were written by Stephen Cosgrove and illustrated by Robin James. The books are short stories with colorful illustrations that have a moral perspective.

Cosgrove wrote the books after searching for an easy to read book with a message to read to his then three-year-old daughter. After finding primarily large expensive books, Cosgrove teamed up with illustrator James to create low cost softcover books. After receiving an offer to publish the books only in hardcover, Cosgrove created his own publishing company - Serendipity Press. The first four books of the Serendipity Series were released in December of 1973. They are: Serendipity, The Dream Tree, Wheedle on the Needle, and The Muffin Muncher. Cosgrove merged Serendipity Press with the publishing company, Price/Stern/Sloan (now part of Penguin Random House) in 1978 so that Cosgrove could focus on writing. Cosgrove decided to re-edit his earlier books, which have been republished with the changes. To date, there are 70 books in the series, written from the kindergarten to grade three levels.

The animals in the Serendipity series include bears, cats, dogs, horses, squirrels, rabbits, and mythical creatures such as unicorns, dragons, sea monsters, and pegasus. Cosgrove also invented his own creatures such as the wheedle, hucklebug and kritter. The books present moral issues such as growing up, disabilities, abuse, fear, friendship, prejudice, gossip, and helping the environment.

The book series was adapted into a 26-episode anime series entitled Serendipity the Pink Dragon and 26-episode cartoon series Little Mouse on the Prairie.

At least 25 of the books were translated into Spanish (based on the list in El Dragon Gloton) and at least 6 in Italian (by Arnoldo Mondadori Editore).

List of Books in the Serendipity Series

Tale of Three Tails 1973

References

External links
Stephen Cosgrove's website
Robin James's website

American picture books
Series of children's books
Children's books about friendship
Fables